Cayman Islands competed at the 2022 Commonwealth Games held in Birmingham, England. This was Cayman Islands's 12th appearance at the Commonwealth Games.

The Cayman Islands team of 21 athletes competing in six sports was announced on 15 July 2022. Rasheem Brown and Alison Jackson were the country's flagbearers during the opening ceremony.

Competitors
The following is the list of number of competitors participating at the Games per sport/discipline.

Athletics

Men
Track and road events

Field events

Women
Track and road events

Boxing

Women

Cycling

Road
Men

Gymnastics

Artistic
Men
Individual Qualification

Individual Finals

Squash

Singles

Doubles

Swimming

Men

Women

References

External links
Birmingham 2022 Commonwealth Games Official site

Nations at the 2022 Commonwealth Games
Cayman Islands at the Commonwealth Games
2022 in Caymanian sport